Dungeon Master: Theron's Quest is a modified version of Dungeon Master for the TurboGrafx/PC Engine video game console. It was released on September 18, 1992 in Japan, with a North American release following the next year.

The main goal of the game is Theron finding seven parts of a blue knight's armor (Shield Defiant, Taza Poleyn, Tazahelm, Taza Boots, Taza Armor, Soulcage, The Retaliator), each of which is located in one of seven mini dungeons.

Differences from the original 

It has a different story, but can be considered as a light version of Dungeon Master. Theron's Quest doesn't contain all of the items, spells and monsters featured in Dungeon Master. Theron's Quest contains seven small dungeons instead of one big dungeon, which however are partially identical or inspired by the original dungeons of Dungeon Master and Chaos Strikes Back. As in the original, the player goes on a quest with a team of up to four champions fighting through dungeons gaining experience and finding items. In contrast to the original, the player takes the role of a character named Theron and three other champions. After successful completion of each dungeon, the whole party loses its collected items and the three champions lose their skills and statistics. Further, the game can only be saved between dungeons. The lack of the original save option during a level has been replaced by many resurrection 'Altars of VI'. There are also fewer monsters to fight which renders the game easier than the original.

Reception
Upon the game's release, all but one of Electronic Gaming Monthly'''s four reviewers remarked that Dungeon Master'', despite having aged badly over the years, remains a solid RPG. The remaining reviewer stated that dungeon crawls "just isn't my type of game." The reviewers generally praised the new CD-quality soundtrack and gave the game a score of 6.5 out of 10.

References

External links 
 

Role-playing video games
Action role-playing video games
First-person party-based dungeon crawler video games
TurboGrafx-CD games
TurboGrafx-CD-only games
Fantasy video games
Puzzle video games
1992 video games
Video games developed in Japan
Video games developed in Australia
Video games scored by Tsukasa Tawada
Single-player video games